Ora is the given name of:

 Ora Alexander (fl. early 1930s), American classic female blues singer
 Ora Anlen (born 1944), Israeli Paralympic athlete in various sports
 Ora Carew (1893–1955), American silent film actress
 Ora Collard (1902–1961), American businessman and politician
 Ora Graves (1896–1961), US Navy sailor and Medal of Honor recipient
 Ora Haibe (1887–1970), American race car driver
 Ora Kedem (born 1924), professor emerita at the Weizmann Institute of Science and recipient of the Israel Prize
 Ora Lassila, Finnish computer scientist
 Ora McMurry, United States Army Air Service pilot during World War I
 Ora Namir (born 1930), Israeli former politician and diplomat
 Ora Nichols, American pioneer of radio sound effects 
 Ora A. Oldfield (1893–1963), American politician and businessman
 Ora R. Rice (1885–1966), American politician
 Ora Washington (1898–1971), African-American tennis player
 Ora, mother of Serug in the Bible